Y102 may refer to:

 WHHY-FM, a radio station nicknamed "Y102" in Montgomery, Alabama, U.S.
 WRFY-FM, a radio station nicknamed "Y102" in Reading, Pennsylvania, U.S.
 KRNY, a radio station nicknamed "Y102" in Kearney, Nebraska, U.S.
 KZXY-FM, a radio station nicknamed "Y102" in Apple Valley, California, U.S.
 Yttrium-102 (Y-102 or 102Y), an isotope of yttrium